Yuri Igorevich Zheleznov (born 15 November 2002) is a Russian football player who plays as a left midfielder for FC Ural Yekaterinburg.

Club career
He made his debut in the Russian Premier League for FC Ural Yekaterinburg on 25 July 2021 in a game against FC Krasnodar. He substituted Ylldren Ibrahimaj in the 66th minute. He scored his first RPL goal for Ural on 20 November 2021, a late equalizer in an away 1–1 draw against PFC Krylia Sovetov Samara.

Career statistics

References

External links
 
 
 

2002 births
People from Saransk
Sportspeople from Mordovia
Living people
Russian footballers
Russia youth international footballers
Russia under-21 international footballers
Association football midfielders
FC Rubin Kazan players
FC Saturn Ramenskoye players
FC Ural Yekaterinburg players
Russian Second League players
Russian Premier League players